Domiporta latistriata is a species of sea snail, a marine gastropod mollusk, in the family Mitridae, the miters or miter snails.

Description
The length of the shell attains 21.7 mm.

Distribution
This marine species occurs off the Marquesas Islands, French Polynesia.

References

Gloria Maris 51(5-6): 149-173

External links
 Fedosov A., Puillandre N., Herrmann M., Kantor Yu., Oliverio M., Dgebuadze P., Modica M.V. & Bouchet P. (2018). The collapse of Mitra: molecular systematics and morphology of the Mitridae (Gastropoda: Neogastropoda). Zoological Journal of the Linnean Society. 183(2): 253-337

latistriata
Gastropods described in 2012